Mýflug/Myflug Air (named after Lake Mývatn in Northern Iceland) is an Icelandic airline established in 1985.

The company operates two different types of airplanes for various roles; Beechcraft Super King Air and Cessna 206. Its main focus is on the ambulance flight service provided to Iceland and charter flights to airfields in Iceland and Greenland.

Mýflug also operates sightseeing flights around Lake Mývatn during the summer months.

Fleet
(as of March 2020)

2 Beechcraft Super King Air
2 Cessna 206

Incidents and Accidents
 On August 5, 2013, a Beechcraft King Air B200 (TF-MYX), an ambulance flight, crashed on a car racing track just west of Akureyri in the north of Iceland after requesting to fly over the town. 2 pilots and a paramedic were on board. The Captain and the paramedic died, but the co-pilot escaped with minor injuries.

References

External links
Official website

Airlines of Iceland
Airlines established in 1985